Karmutzen Mountain is a mountain located in the Karmutzen Range on Vancouver Island in British Columbia.  It is to the west of Nimpkish Lake which was formerly known as Karmutzen Lake.

History
The mountain name was adapted from the Kwakwaka'wakw word for "waterfall."

External links

Sources

References

Karmutzen Mountain
Vancouver Island Ranges
Rupert Land District